Lukáš Rosol was the defending champion but decided not to participate.
Thomaz Bellucci  defeated Tobias Kamke 7–6(7–4), 6–3 in the final to win the tournament.

Seeds

Draw

Finals

Top half

Bottom half

References
 Main Draw
 Qualifying Draw

Sparkassen Open - Singles
2012 Singles